The Texas Chainsaw Massacre is an American horror franchise consisting of nine slasher films, comics, and a video game adaptation of the original film. The franchise focuses on the cannibalistic spree killer Leatherface and his family, who terrorize unsuspecting visitors to their territories in the desolate Texas countryside, typically killing and subsequently cooking them. The original film was released in 1974, directed and produced by Tobe Hooper and written by Hooper and Kim Henkel. Hooper and Henkel were involved in three of the later films.

The film series has grossed over $252 million at the worldwide box office.

Films

The Texas Chain Saw Massacre, released in 1974, written and directed by Tobe Hooper, was the first and most successful entry in the series. It is considered to be the first of the 1970s slasher films, and originated a great many of the clichés seen in countless later low-budget slashers. Its plot concerns a family of cannibals living in rural Texas, who abduct customers from their gas station. The film's most notable character, Leatherface, is one of the most well-known villains in cinema history, notable for his masks made of human skin, his blood-soaked butcher's apron and the chainsaw he wields. Although the film is marketed as a true story, it does not depict actual events, and is instead (as with the film Psycho) inspired by notorious killer Ed Gein, who acted alone and did not use a chainsaw.

The Texas Chainsaw Massacre 2 (1986) is set 13 years after the events of the first film. Although it managed to recoup its relatively small budget, the film was not considered a financial success. Since its initial release, however, it has developed a cult following of its own. Unlike its predecessor, which combined minimal gore with a documentary-style nature, the sequel is a comedic horror film, filled with black humor and various gore effects created by make-up maestro Tom Savini. The film features an appearance by novelist Kinky Friedman as well as film critic Joe Bob Briggs. Briggs' cameo appearance was originally cut in editing, but was restored for the director's cut version of the film when it was released on DVD.

Leatherface: The Texas Chainsaw Massacre III is a 1990 follow-up to the previous two films. It stars Kate Hodge, Ken Foree, and Viggo Mortensen and was directed by Jeff Burr. At the time, this was considered to be the first of several sequels in the series to be produced by New Line Cinema, but was not a commercial success, and New Line had no further involvement in the series. Texas Chainsaw Massacre: The Next Generation (1995) is the fourth and final film in the original series. Though it was shelved by Columbia Pictures after initial screenings, the film was released in 1997 after stars Renée Zellweger and Matthew McConaughey gained notoriety.

The 2003 remake, The Texas Chainsaw Massacre, directed by Marcus Nispel, written by Scott Kosar and produced by Michael Bay, is based on the events of the first film, but for the most part, it follows a different storyline. A major difference between the two films, for example, is that rather than picking up Leatherface's psychotic hitchhiker brother, the group instead come upon a traumatized survivor who shoots herself in their van. The film gives Leatherface's background, a real name (Thomas Brown Hewitt), as well as a possible reason for his wearing masks, namely a skin disease which has caused his nose to rot away. The remake received a mixed critical response upon release, but was financially successful enough to lead to a prequel, The Texas Chainsaw Massacre: The Beginning (2006), which takes place in 1969. Directed by Jonathan Liebesman, written by Sheldon Turner and produced by Michael Bay, it explores the roots of Leatherface's family and delves into their past. Leatherface's first mask is featured, as well as the first murder he commits using a chainsaw. It grossed less than its predecessor and has received a largely negative reception from film critics.

The seventh film, Texas Chainsaw 3D (2013), is a direct sequel to the original 1974 film, and makes no reference to the events of the other sequels. The film was directed by John Luessenhop, and written by Adam Marcus, Kirsten Elms, and Debra Sullivan. Texas Chainsaw follows a young girl named Heather, who is travelling to Texas with her friends to collect an inheritance from her deceased grandmother, whom she had never met. There, Heather discovers that she is part of the Sawyer family, who were killed by the townspeople following the events of the 1974 film, as well as a cousin of Leatherface. According to Seth M. Sherwood, writer of the prequel Leatherface (2017), the eighth film is part of a continuity that consists of Leatherface, The Texas Chain Saw Massacre (1974), and Texas Chainsaw 3D.

Following the release of Leatherface, the producers had the rights to make five more Texas Chainsaw Massacre films. Producer Christa Campbell stated that the fate of the potential films would largely depend on the financial reception and perceived fan reactions regarding the 2017 prequel. Lionsgate and Millennium Films lost the franchise rights in December the same year due to the time it took to release it. Legendary Entertainment subsequently acquired the franchise's rights with interest in developing television and film projects.

The ninth film, Texas Chainsaw Massacre, takes place 50 years after the events of the original Texas Chain Saw Massacre and is in continuity with the original series. The film stars Sarah Yarkin, Elsie Fisher, Moe Dunford, Nell Hudson, Jessica Allain, Olwen Fouéré, Jacob Latimore, and Alice Krige. In addition, Mark Burnham portrays an older Leatherface, replacing the late Gunnar Hansen, while Olwen Fouéré plays Sally Hardesty, replacing the late Marilyn Burns. Original directors, Ryan and Andy Tohill, were fired a week into filming and were replaced with David Blue Garcia. Chris Thomas Devlin wrote the screenplay with the story by Fede Álverez and Rodo Sayagues. The film skipped a theatrical release and was instead released on Netflix, on February 18, 2022. The film received mostly negative reviews.

Recurring cast and characters

 This table only shows characters that have appeared in three or more films in the series.
 A dark grey cell indicates that the character was not in the film or that the character's presence in the film has yet to be announced.
 An  indicates an appearance through archival footage or stills.
 A  indicates a cameo role.
 An  indicates an appearance not included in the theatrical cut.
 An  indicates a role as a stunt performer.
 A  indicates an unmasked role.
 A  indicates a voice-only role.
 A  indicates a younger version of the character.

Reception

When comparing The Texas Chainsaw Massacre to the other top-grossing horror film series – A Nightmare on Elm Street, Child's Play, Friday the 13th, Halloween, the Hannibal Lecter series, Psycho, Saw, and Scream – and adjusting for the 2011 inflation, The Texas Chainsaw Massacre is the eighth highest grossing horror film series in the United States, with a combined gross of $304.6 million, only outperforming the Child's Play film series with approximately $203 million. The series is led by Friday the 13th at $687.1 million, A Nightmare on Elm Street with $592.8 million, the Hannibal Lecter film series with $588.7 million, Halloween with $557.5 million, Saw with $457.4 million, Scream with $442.9 million, and the Psycho film series, with $376.3 million.

Other media

Books

Stephen Hand wrote a novelization of The Texas Chainsaw Massacre that was published March 1, 2004, by Black Flame.

Comics

Several comic books based on The Texas Chainsaw Massacre films were published in 1991 by Northstar Comics entitled Leatherface. They were licensed as The Texas Chainsaw Massacre to Avatar Press for use in new comic book stories, the first of which was published in 2005. In 2006, Avatar Press lost the license to DC Comics imprint, Wildstorm, which has published new stories based on the films. However, in June 2007, Wildstorm changed a number of horror comics, including The Texas Chainsaw Massacre, from monthly issues to specials and miniseries.

The series of comics featured none of the main characters seen in the original film (Topps Comics Jason vs. Leatherface series is exempt) with the exception of Leatherface. The 1991 Leatherface miniseries was loosely based on the third Texas Chainsaw Massacre film. The writer of the miniseries, Mort Castle said: "The series was very loosely based on Texas Chainsaw Massacre III. I worked from the original script by David Schow and the heavily edited theatrical release of director Jeff Burr, but had more or less free rein to write the story the way it should have been told. The first issue sold 30,000 copies". Kirk Jarvinen drew the illustrations for the first issue, and Guy Burwell finished the rest of the series. The comics, not having the same censorship restrictions from the MPAA, featured much more gore than the finished film. The ending, as well as the fates of several characters, was also altered. An adaptation of The Texas Chain Saw Massacre was planned by Northstar Comics, but never came to fruition.

Video games
In 1982, The Texas Chainsaw Massacre, a mass-market video game adaptation of The Texas Chain Saw Massacre was released for the Atari 2600 by Wizard Video. In the game, the player assumes the role of Leatherface, and attempts to murder trespassers while avoiding obstacles such as fences and cow skulls. As one of the first horror-themed video games, The Texas Chain Saw Massacre caused controversy when it was released due to the violent nature of the video game and sold poorly as many video game stores refused to carry it. Wizard Video's other commercial release, Halloween, had a slightly better reception, but the limited number of copies sold has made both games highly valued items among Atari collectors.

At The Game Awards held in December 2021, a new game, The Texas Chain Saw Massacre, based around the original film was announced to be released by Gun Interactive, the company behind Friday the 13th: The Game.

All American Massacre
In 1998, filming began for All American Massacre, an installment which would have served as both a sequel and prequel to The Texas Chainsaw Massacre 2. The film was initially conceived as a 15-minute short, but was expanded to a 60-minute feature. It was directed by William Hooper, son of Tobe Hooper. Bill Moseley reprised his role as the character Chop Top, who would have been revealed to have survived the events of The Texas Chainsaw Massacre 2 and been in a Texas psychiatric prison for a number of years. The plot of the film would have centered on Chop Top detailing his past in an interview with a news crew, before carrying out a new series of murders. A trailer for All American Massacre was released on the internet, but the film itself was never released.

Cultural impact

The Texas Chainsaw Massacre content has been featured in the video games Mortal Kombat X, Dead by Daylight, Call of Duty: Modern Warfare and Call of Duty: Warzone respectively.

Notes

References

Further reading

External links
 
 
 
 
 
 
 
 

 
Texas Chain Saw Massacre
Horror film franchises
American film series
Film series introduced in 1974
Films adapted into comics
Splatterpunk